Stosunki Międzynarodowe ("International Relations") is a monthly journal in Poland dedicated to international relations, foreign policy and diplomacy. It was founded on 1999 by Michał Sikorski. The editorial office is currently located in Warsaw. Stosunki Międzynarodowe has a circulation of 6,000 copies and is published by International Relations Research Institute in Warsaw (Instytut Badań nad Stosunkami Międzynarodowymi).

External links
 http://www.stosunki.pl

International relations journals
Polish-language journals
Monthly journals
Publications established in 1999
Academic journals published in Poland